Kancho Yordanov (born 22 June 1965 in Kazanlak) is a former Bulgarian footballer who played as a forward. In his career he played for Rozova Dolina, Etar Veliko Tarnovo, Levski Sofia, CSKA Sofia and Turkish side Karşıyaka.

Honours

Club
Levski Sofia
 A Group: 1994–95
 Bulgarian Cup: 1993–94

CSKA Sofia
 A Group: 1996–97
 Bulgarian Cup: 1996–97

References

External links
Player Profile at LevskiSofia.info

1965 births
Living people
Bulgarian footballers
Association football forwards
FC Etar Veliko Tarnovo players
PFC Levski Sofia players
Karşıyaka S.K. footballers
PFC CSKA Sofia players
First Professional Football League (Bulgaria) players
Süper Lig players
Bulgarian expatriate footballers
Expatriate footballers in Turkey
People from Kazanlak